Trading with the Enemy Act is a stock short title used for legislation in the United Kingdom and the United States relating to trading with the enemy.

Trading with the Enemy Acts is also a generic name for a class of legislation generally passed during or approaching a war that prohibit not just mercantile activities with foreign nationals, but also acts that might assist the enemy. While originally limited to wartime, in the 20th century these Acts were applied in cases of national emergency as well.  For example, in 1940, before the United States entry into World War II the president imposed broad prohibitions on the transfer of property in which Norway or Denmark, or any citizen or national of those countries, or any other person aiding those countries, had any interest, with the exception of transfers which were licensed under the regulations of the Department of the Treasury.

List

France
Continental System, French Napoleonic edict from 1806 to 1814

United Kingdom
The Trading with the Enemy Act 1914
The Trading with the Enemy Amendment Act 1914 (5 & 6 Geo 5 c 12)
The Trading with the Enemy Amendment Act 1915 (5 & 6 Geo 5 c 79)
The Trading with the Enemy (Extension of Powers) Act 1915 (5 & 6 Geo 5 c 98)
The Trading with the Enemy Amendment Act 1916 (5 & 6 Geo 5 c 105)
The Trading with the Enemy (Copyright) Act 1916 (6 & 7 Geo 5 c 32)
The Trading with the Enemy and Export of Prohibited Goods Act 1916 (6 & 7 Geo 5 c 52)
The Trading with the Enemy (Amendment) Act 1918 (8 & 9 Geo 5 c 31)
The Trading with the Enemy Act 1939 (2 & 3 Geo 6 c 89)

United States
 The Trading with the Enemy Act of 1917 is still in force. This Act established the Office of Alien Property Custodian to manage the property of US enemies, such as patents filed in the US by German nationals. The US government office was intended to manage that intellectual property in the US interest during the war.

Israel

The British Trading with the Enemy Act 1939 was applied to Mandatory Palestine, as to other British-ruled territories. On the creation of Israel in 1948, it was retained as an Israeli law and the various Arab countries named in it as "The Enemy". It is still in force , though Egypt and Jordan were removed from its application with the respective peace agreements Israel signed with them.

See also
 List of short titles

Notes

Further reading
 Bordwell, Percy (1908) The Law of War between Belligerents: a history and commentary Callaghan, Chicago ; reprinted in 1994 by Fred B. Rothman, Littleton, Colorado, 
 Cain, Frank (2007) Economic statecraft during the Cold War: European responses to the US trade embargo Routledge, London, 
 Carter, Barry E. (1988) International Economic Sanctions: improving the haphazard U.S. legal regime Cambridge University Press, Cambridge, England, 
 Malloy, Michael P. (2001) United States Economic Sanctions: Theory and Practice Kluwer Law International, The Hague, Netherlands, 

Law of war
Economic warfare